Milić Jovanović (Serbian Cyrillic: Милић Јовановић; born 10 February 1966) is a Serbian retired footballer who played as a goalkeeper.

Football career
Born in Kruševac, Socialist Federal Republic of Yugoslavia, Jovanović played for FK Napredak Kruševac, Red Star Belgrade and FK Mogren in his homeland. He won the 1990–91 Yugoslav First League with Red Star, acting as backup to Stevan Stojanović.

In 1993, aged 27, Jovanović moved to Portugal where he would remain the following eight years, until his retirement. He started with S.C.U. Torreense in the second division, then switched to C.D. Nacional for a further two years in the category.

Jovanović made his Portuguese top level debut in the 1996–97 season, appearing in only one game, a 0–1 away loss against Gil Vicente FC. During most of his spell in Leça da Palmeira he played understudy to compatriot Vladan Stojković, and totalled eight matches in the main division, eventually retiring in 2001 at the age of 35 with the club again in level two.

After his retirement, Jovanović worked with his last club as a goalkeeping coach. He also had head and assistant coach spells there.

External links
Yugoslavia stats at Zerodic

1966 births
Living people
Yugoslav footballers
Serbian footballers
Association football goalkeepers
Yugoslav First League players
FK Napredak Kruševac players
Red Star Belgrade footballers
FK Mogren players
Primeira Liga players
Liga Portugal 2 players
C.D. Nacional players
Leça F.C. players
Serbian expatriate footballers
Expatriate footballers in Portugal
Serbian expatriate sportspeople in Portugal
Serbian football managers